Milano Bovisa is a railway station in Bovisa, Milan, Italy. It opened in 1879 and is now one of the key nodes of the Milan suburban railway service, and of the Trenord regional network in northern Lombardy. It is located in Piazza Emilio Alfieri.

The station serves the Bovisa neighborhood, in the northwestern part of the Milan municipality, and in particular the Bovisa Campus of the Politecnico di Milano, the biggest technical university in Italy.

The station is served by lines S1, S2, S3, S4, S12, and S13 of the Milan suburban railway service, by the Milan–Asso, Milan–Saronno–Como, Milan–Saronno–Novara and Milan–Saronno–Varese–Laveno regional lines, and by the Malpensa Express.

See also
Railway stations in Milan
Milan suburban railway service
Milan Passante railway

References

External links

Bovisa
Ferrovienord stations
Railway stations opened in 1879
Milan S Lines stations
1879 establishments in Italy
Railway stations in Italy opened in the 19th century